Esther (Etty) Hillesum (15 January 1914 – 30 November 1943) was the Dutch author of confessional letters and diaries which describe both her religious awakening and the persecutions of Jewish people in Amsterdam during the German occupation. In 1943, she was deported and murdered in Auschwitz concentration camp.

Life
Esther (Etty) Hillesum was born on 15 January 1914 in her family home in the town of Middelburg, the oldest of the three children – she had two brothers, Jacob or 'Jaap' (1916–1945) and Michael or 'Mischa' (1920–1944) – of Levie Hillesum (1880–1943) and Riva Bernstein (1881–1943). After completing school in 1932, she moved to Amsterdam to study law and Slavic languages. There, she met Hendrik (Hans) J. Wegerif with whom she had a relationship that she describes in her diaries.

Etty Hillesum began writing her diary in March 1941, possibly at the suggestion of her analyst Julius Spier, whom she had been consulting for a month. Although his patient, Etty also became his secretary, friend, and, eventually, his lover. His influence on her spiritual development is apparent in her diaries; as well as teaching her how to deal with her depressive and egocentric episodes he introduced her to the Bible and St. Augustine and helped her develop a deeper understanding of the work of Rilke and Dostoyevsky.

Her diaries record the increasing anti-Jewish measures imposed by the occupying German army, and the growing uncertainty about the fate of fellow Jews who had been deported by them. As well as forming a record of oppression, her diaries describe her spiritual development and deepening faith in God.

When round-ups of Jews intensified in July 1942, she took on administrative duties for the Jewish Council, voluntarily transferring to a department of "Social Welfare for People in Transit" at Westerbork transit camp. She worked there for a month, but returned in June 1943, by which time she had refused offers to go into hiding in the belief that her duty was to support others scheduled to be transported from Westerbork to the concentration camps in German-occupied Poland and Germany. On 5 July 1943, her personnel status was suddenly revoked and she became a camp internee along with her father, mother, and brother Mischa.

On 7 September 1943, the family were deported from Westerbork to Auschwitz. Only Jaap Hillesum did not go with them; he arrived in Westerbork after their removal and in February 1944 was sent to Bergen-Belsen, dying shortly after its liberation in April 1945.

Etty Hillesum's parents are recorded as having died on 10 September 1943, suggesting they died in transit or were murdered immediately upon their arrival. Mischa Hillesum remained in Auschwitz until October 1943, when he was moved to the Warsaw Ghetto, where, according to the Red Cross, he died before 31 March 1944. Etty was murdered in Auschwitz on 30 November 1943.

Personal growth and philosophy
Etty Hillesum's youth was chaotic and turbulent, possibly resulting from her emotionally unstable family, to which she herself referred as a "madhouse". Her diaries reflect the inner turmoil that she experiences during her young adulthood, as well as the healing and growth during the years before her murder.

Russian authors and Christian mystics likely contributed to Hillesum's understanding of spirituality. She did not strive for ecstasy, but longed to meet the depth of her own interior and life itself. Her spirituality was not confined to her intellectual understanding of a greater power and is reflected in her diaries. In the concentration camp of Westerbork, she had unusual experiences of spiritual awakenings and insight: "Those two months behind barbed wire have been the two richest and most intense months of my life, in which my highest values were so deeply confirmed. I have learnt to love Westerbork". Hillesum addressed God repeatedly in her diaries, regarding him not as a saviour, but as a power one must nurture inside of oneself: "Alas, there doesn't seem to be much You Yourself can do about our circumstances, about our lives. Neither do I hold You responsible. You cannot help us, but we must help You and defend Your dwelling place inside us to the last."
Still in Amsterdam, Hillesum developed an ideology of showing others the way to their own interior in a time of great adversity – the Nazi terror. Her time at Westerbork – as reflected in her diaries – portrays the redemption of her spirit, while her body was captured and eventually murdered. She neither denies the horror of the Nazi terror, nor identifies with her victimhood. In the midst of extreme conditions, Hillesum develops an awareness of the indestructible beauty of this world. She writes during her time at Westerbork: "The sky is full of birds, the purple lupins stand up so regally and peacefully, two little old women have sat down for a chat, the sun is shining on my face – and right before our eyes, mass murder... The whole thing is simply beyond comprehension." Hillesum continuously writes from a place of great tenderness, empathy, and realization.

Hillesum suffers great inner turmoil during her young adulthood, but increasingly transforms into a woman of maturity and wisdom. She writes: "Everywhere things are both very good and very bad at the same time. The two are in balance, everywhere and always. I never have the feeling that I have got to make the best of things; everything is fine just as it is. Every situation, however miserable, is complete in itself and contains the good as well as the bad." In touch with the equilibrium of a bigger picture she is aware of, she continuously draws from this place to find meaning in her current reality. On 7 September 1943, less than 3 months before her murder, she threw a postcard with her final words out of a train: "Opening the Bible at random I find this: 'The Lord is my high tower'. I am sitting on my rucksack in the middle of a full freight car. Father, Mother, and Mischa are a few cars away. In the end, the departure came without warning... We left the camp singing... Thank you for all your kindness and care."

Others' views
Richard Layard has spoken with great appreciation of Hillesum's view that one must preserve one's inner self, or core.

Rowan Rheingans has drawn on Hillesum's writing, particularly on the coexistence of beauty and horror, and on allowing room for sorrow, in her album "The lines we draw together".

The diaries
Before she left for Westerbork, Etty Hillesum gave her diaries to Maria Tuinzing, with the instruction they be passed to Klaas Smelik for publication, should she not survive. Attempts to have them published proved fruitless until 1979, when Smelik's son, the director of the Etty Hillesum Research Centre, approached publisher J. G. Gaarlandt. An abridged edition of her diaries appeared in 1981 under the title , followed by a collection of her letters from Westerbork. A complete edition of her letters and diaries was published in Dutch in 1986 and translated into English in 2002. Her diaries were translated into 18 languages. Her letters were sent to friends and Hillesum's final postcard was thrown from the train in Westerbork, where it was discovered by Dutch farmers after her death.

Publications
 An Interrupted Life: The Diaries of Etty Hillesum 1941–1943
 Etty Hillesum: An Interrupted Life the Diaries, 1941–1943 and Letters from Westerbork
 Etty Hillesum: Essential Writings (Modern Spiritual Masters)
 Anne Frank and Etty Hillesum: Inscribing Spirituality and Sexuality
 Etty Hillesum: Letters from Westerbork

Research centre and museum
On 13 June 2006, the Etty Hillesum Research Centre (EHOC) was officially opened as part of Ghent University with a celebration at Sint-Pietersplein 5. It studies and promotes the research of Hillesum's World War II letters and diaries.

The Centre is directed by Prof. Dr. Klaas A.D. Smelik, who edited and published the Complete edition of the Letters and Diaries, and teaches Hebrew and Judaism at Ghent University. Staff member Dr. Meins G. S. Coetsier is the author of Etty Hillesum and the Flow of Presence: A Voegelinian Analysis.

A monument to Etty Hillesum is located in Deventer on the riverfront, and the local secondary schools are named after her. There is also a modest museum dedicated to her memory, the Etty Hillesum Centre, housed at Roggestraat 3, Deventer, the location of a former synagogue and Jewish school.

The poet Doron Braunshtein dedicated to Hillesum the poem "Etty Hillesum is my life" which is in his 2016's album "The lost New York diaries"

See also
 List of Holocaust diarists
 List of posthumous publications of Holocaust victims
 Helga Deen – wrote a diary in 's-Hertogenbosch concentration camp (Camp Vught)
 List of Dutch Jews
 List of diarists

References

Primary sources
The original handwritten letters and diaries of Etty Hillesum. Amsterdam: Jewish Historical Museum, 1941–43.
Twee brieven uit Westerbork van Etty. Introduction by David Koning. The Hague: Bert Bakker/Daamen N.V., 1962.
Het Verstoorde leven: Dagboek van Etty Hillesum 1941–1943. Edited with an introduction by Jan Geurt Gaarlandt. Haarlem: De Haan, 1981.
 Het Verstoorde leven is translated in at least fourteen languages: England: Etty – A Diary (1983) Germany: Das denkende Herz der Baracke (1983) Denmark: Et kraenket liv (1983) Norway: Det tenkende hjerte (1983) Sweden: Det förstörda livet (1983) Finland: Päiväkirja, 1941–1943 (1984) America: An Interrupted Life (1984) Brasil: Una Vida Interrompida (1984) Italy: Diario 1941–1943 (1985) Argentina: Una Vida Interrompida (1985) Israel: Chajjiem Kerotiem; Jomana sjel (1985) Japan (1985) and Hungary. France: Une Vie Bouleversée. Journal 1941–1943, translation par Philippe Noble. Editions du Sieul. Paris, 1985.
 Het denkende hart van de barak. Brieven van Etty Hillesum. Edited with an introduction by Jan Geurt Gaarlandt. Haarlem: De Haan,1982.
 In duizend zoete armen: Nieuwe dagboekaantekeningen van Etty Hillesum. Edited with an introduction by Jan Geurt Gaarlandt. Haarlem: De Haan, 1984.
 Etty: A Diary 1941–1943. Introduction by Jan Geurt Gaarlandt, translation by Arnold J. Pomerans. London: Johathan Cape, 1983.
 An Interrupted Life: The Diaries and Letters of Etty Hillesum 1941–1943. Introduction by Jan Geurt Gaarlandt, translation by Arnold J. Pomerans. New York: Pantheon Books,1984.
 Letters from Westerbork. Introduction by Jan Geurt Gaarlandt, translation by Arnold J. Pomerans. New York: Pantheon Books,1986.
 Letters from Westerbork. Introduction by Jan Geurt Gaarlandt, translation by Arnold J. Pomerans. London: Johathan Cape,1987.
 An Interrupted Life and Letters from Westerbork. New York: Henry Holt, 1996.
 An Interrupted Life: The Diaries and Letters of Etty Hillesum. Preface by Eva Hoffman, London: Persephone Books,1999.
Etty: The Letters and Diaries of Etty Hillesum 1941–1943.Edited with an introduction by Klaas A. D. Smelik, translation by Arnold J. Pomerans. Ottawa, Ontario: Novalis Saint Paul University – William B. Eerdmans Publishing Company, 2002.
Etty: De nagelaten geschriften van Etty Hillesum 1941–1943. Edited, introduced and annotated by Klaas A. D. Smelik. Amsterdam: Uitgeverij Balans, 1986.()
 "Etty Hillesum. Un Itineraire Spirituel, Amsterdam 1941-Auscwitz 1943" Paul Lebau, Collections Spiritualites.

Secondary sources
 Bériault, Yves o.p., Etty Hillesum témoin de Dieu dans l'abîme du mal, Montreal, Médiaspaul, 2010, 192 pp.
 Brandt, Ria van den & Smelik, Klaas A.D. Etty Hillesum in facetten. Nijmegen: Uitgeverij Damon, 2003.
 Brandt, Ria van den & Smelik, Etty Hillesum Studies: Etty Hillesum in context. Assen: Gorcum, 2008.
 Brenner, Rachel Feldhay.  Writing as Resistance: Four Women Confronting the Holocaust: Edith Stein, Simone Weil, Anne Frank, Etty Hillesum. Pennsylvania: Pennsylvania State University Press, 1997.
 Coetsier, Meins G. S. Etty Hillesum and the Flow of Presence: A Voegelinian Analysis. Columbia Missouri: University of Missouri Press, 2008.
 Coetsier, Meins G. S. 'God? ... Licht in het duister: Twee denkers in barre tijden: de Duitse filosoof Eric Voegelin en de Nederlands-Joodse schrijfster Etty Hillesum,' in Etty Hillesum Studies: Etty Hillesum in context, red. Ria van den Brandt en Klaas A.D. Smelik, Assen: Gorcum, 2008.
 Costa, Denise de. Anne Frank and Etty Hillesum: Inscribing spirituality and sexuality. Translation by Mischa F. C. Hoyinck and Robert E. Chesal. New Brunswick, New Jersey, and London: Rutgers University Press, 1998.
 Du Parc Locmaria, Marie-Hélène. Tant souffrir et tant aimer selon Etty Hillesum, Éditions Salvator, Paris, 2011, 256 pp.
 Frank, Evelyne. Avec Etty Hillesum : Dans la quête du bonheur, un chemin inattendu. Une lecture d'une vie bouleversée et des lettres de Westerbork, Genève: Labor et Fides, 2002.
 Gaarland, J. Geurt, ed. Men zou een pleister op vele wonden willen zijn: Reacties op de dagboeken en brieven van Etty Hillesum. Amsterdam: Balans, 1989.
 Nocita, Maria Gabriella, Feeling life: Etty Hillesum becomes word, in Spirituality in the Writings of Etty Hillesum, Proceedings of the Etty Hillesum Conference at Ghent University, November 2008, edited by Klaas A.D. Smelik, Ria van den Brandt, and Meins G.S. Coetsier, Brill, Leiden–Boston, 2010.
 Oord, Gerrit van, ed. L’esperienza dell’Altro: Studi su Etty Hillesum. Rome: Sant’Oreste, 1990.
 Regenhardt, Jan Willem. Mischa's Spel en de ondergang van de familie Hillesum. Amsterdam: Balans, 2012.
 Woodhouse, Patrick. Etty Hillesum: A life transformed. London, Continuum, 2009, 166 pp.
 Amazon, n.d. Web. 21 March 2017.
 Culliford, Larry. "Spiritual Maturity: The Case of Etty Hillesum Part 3 – Final Days."Psychology Today. Psychology Today, 10 October 2011. Web. 21 March 2017.
 Downey, Michael. "The Netherlands – The Spiritual Legacy of Etty Hillesum." Charter for Compassion. Charter for Compassion, n.d. Web. 21 March 2017.
 Hillesum, Etty, K.A.D Smelik, Ria Van Den Brandt, and Carolyn Coman. Spirituality in the Writings of Etty Hillesum: Proceedings of the Etty Hillesum Conference at Ghent University, November 2008. Leiden: Brill, 2010. Web. 21 March 2017.
Kroner, Stephanie. "Etty Hillesum, "Life Is Beautiful, In Spite of Everything"." Unitarian Universalist Church of Berkeley. N.p., 2 November 2015. Web. 21 March 2017.
Walters, Kerry. The Art of Dying and Living. New York: Orbis, 2010. Web.

External links

 The Etty Hillesum Research Centre
 Etty Hillesum Congress 2008 at Ghent University
 ettyhillesumcolombia.mex.tl

1914 births
1943 deaths
Dutch diarists
Dutch Jews who died in the Holocaust
Jewish Dutch writers
Dutch people of Russian-Jewish descent
Dutch civilians killed in World War II
People from Deventer
People from Middelburg, Zeeland
Dutch people who died in Auschwitz concentration camp
Dutch literature
Women religious writers
Women mystics
Women diarists
Holocaust diarists
Jewish non-fiction writers
20th-century Dutch women writers
Westerbork transit camp survivors